Rob Foreman (born 27 May 1984) is a former New Zealand rugby union player. He notably played in the hooker position for Manawatu provincially.  Foreman has also played for the New Zealand Universities team.

Playing for the Varsity club in Palmerston North, Foreman played 110 matches for the Manawatu province.

In 2012 he signed with the Hurricanes Super Rugby franchise as injury cover, this included him traveling to South Africa. Although he was told he would be used as a substitute, he was replaced and never took the field.

Foreman played his 100th game for Manawatu in the 2014 NPC Championship final against Hawkes Bay.

His last game was against Wellington in the 39–33 win in 2015, where he came on as a replacement.

Personal 
Foreman owns a farm in Makuri. He and his partner have three children together.

References 

1984 births
New Zealand rugby union players
Manawatu rugby union players
Rugby union hookers
Living people
Universal College of Learning alumni
People educated at Wairarapa College
People from Pahiatua
Rugby union players from Manawatū-Whanganui